Geophilus pusillifrater is a species of soil centipede in the family Geophilidae found in Bosnia-Herzegovina and Britain. It's a relatively small, pale species (up to 13mm in length), prehensorial claws with pointed teeth at the base, distinct chitin lines, and a very broad ventral plate of the pregenital segment. It's at least partially a littoral creature. Males of this species have 39 or 41 pairs of legs; females have 43 leg pairs.

References 

pusillifrater
Animals described in 1898
Fauna of Bosnia and Herzegovina
Myriapods of Europe
Taxa named by Karl Wilhelm Verhoeff